Serge Bengono (born 3 August 1977) is a Cameroonian sprinter who specializes in the 100 metres.

Career
He competed at the 2000 Summer Olympics and the World Championships in 2001 and 2003 without reaching the final.

His personal best times are 10.25 seconds in the 100 metres, achieved at the 1999 All-Africa Games in Johannesburg; and 20.89 seconds in the 200 metres, achieved in April 2002 in Knoxville. He is also a national record holder in the 4 x 100 metres relay, achieved at the 1999 World Championships. In relay he also competed at the 1997 World Championships.

Serge Bengono is currently an assistant track coach at Norfolk State University.

References

External links
 

1977 births
Living people
Cameroonian male sprinters
Athletes (track and field) at the 2000 Summer Olympics
Olympic athletes of Cameroon
Athletes (track and field) at the 1998 Commonwealth Games
Athletes (track and field) at the 2002 Commonwealth Games
Commonwealth Games competitors for Cameroon
World Athletics Championships athletes for Cameroon
20th-century Cameroonian people
21st-century Cameroonian people